Jusuf Buxhovi (born 4 August 1946 in Peć, Democratic Federal Yugoslavia) is a Kosovar-Albanian author, journalist, intellectual, and political activist.

He attended primary and secondary schools in Gjakova and he studied Albanian language and literature at the University of Pristina. In 1977 he started graduate studies at the Department of History in University of Pristina, then in 1979 he graduated with his thesis "The League of Prizren in German archives".

In 1967, he began his career as a reporter for the nation’s leading daily, Rilindja, and shortly after — while still in his twenties — became the newspaper’s culture editor. In 1976, he moved to Bonn, the former capital of Germany, to serve as Rilindja’s permanent correspondent for the next twenty-four years. After the newspaper's closure, he worked as a freelance publicist.

In the late 1980s, at a critical time for Kosovo, Buxhovi cofounded the Democratic League of Kosova, the first opposition party that for almost a decade led the Albanian people in a peaceful resistance against the Serbian occupation.

Buxhovi has written scores of fiction and non-fiction titles, including prizewinning novels, a novella, short stories, dramas, literary critique, political commentaries, and history books. Some of his Albanian-language works have been translated into English, French, Serbo-Croatian, and Slovenian.

References

1946 births
Living people